Graham Barry Stokes, 9 February 1958, Birmingham, West Midlands, England) is a British music executive and musician. He grew up in Leigh Park, Hampshire, attending Wakeford Comprehensive (now known as Havant Academy). He spent his early life playing in various bands as a guitarist, before landing a job at Arista Records as a post boy in 1979.

Career

Early career
He was soon recruited by the Radio and Television Promotions Department at Arista Records and worked with bands such as The Beat and Secret Affair. He then spent the next 10 years working at some of London's biggest record labels including London Records, Island Records and MCA Records where he helped to guide the careers of Bananarama, Bobby Brown, Communards, Fine Young Cannibals, Kim Wilde and Run DMC.

Recording career
In 1989 he embarked on a recording career under the name Graham Stokes, then under the pseudonym Graystoke and finally as lead guitarist with the band Broken Wings. Broken Wings released their eponymous debut album in 1996. Stokes also wrote songs for other artists during this time including a Top 40 hit for the Irish boyband, Reel, and their debut single, "Lift Me Up".

2000 to 2009
In 2000, Stokes set up his first record label called GSM Records. He signed the five-piece girl band Girls@Play who went on to release two hit singles. The tracks were produced by Mike Stock of Stock Aitken Waterman fame, with whom Stokes had worked in the 1980s with Bananarama. The first single "Airhead" released in February 2001 reached No. 18 in the UK Singles Chart, whilst their second single, "Respectable", released in October 2001 reached No. 29. When the label was sold on to the original investors, Stokes once again teamed up with Mike Stock to run his new label Better the Devil Records. They signed Fast Food Rockers a British pop trio whose debut single, "The Fast Food Song", reached No. 2 in the UK Singles Chart in June 2003. They went on to have two further Top 30 records.

In 2004, Stokes went on to launch his own record label Shell Records releasing four BWO studio albums, and working with The Alex Cuba Band and Sandra McCracken.

Conehead UK
In 2009, Stokes launched new independent record label Conehead UK. In July 2009, Peter Andre signed to the label, and his album, Revelation released by Conehead reached No. 3 in the UK Albums Chart. Andre's second album with the label, Accelerate was released in October 2010, and went on to reach No. 10 in the UK Albums Chart in its first week. In 2009, Stokes struck a deal for Conehead with Swedish company Bonnier, who had acquired the rights to new albums from BWO. He then went on to sign to Conehead Another Level's Dane Bowers, the critically acclaimed Ella Chi, London singer/songwriters The Rise, Anthony Goldsbrough and Michael Gazzard, Canadian band In-Flight Safety and Finnish musician and keyboardist with Sunrise Avenue; Osmo.

In 2011, Conehead announced four new major signings. Former X Factor finalist Rhydian signed to Conehead in early 2011 and released the album Waves on 1 August 2011. Engelbert Humperdinck signed with Conehead in June and released a new studio album in 2012. In July, Julian Lennon became the tenth artist on Conehead's roster and released his album Everything Changes on 3 October 2011. X Factor finalist and I'm a Celebrity...Get Me Out of Here! winner Stacey Solomon also joined the roster, and her first album with Conehead was released in 2015.

References

External links
Ggrahamstokes.com
Coneheaduk.com

1958 births
People from Birmingham, West Midlands
British rock guitarists
British music industry executives
Living people